Daisy Swamp is a swamp in Berkeley County, South Carolina, in the United States.

Daisy Swamp was named for the Deas family of landowners.

References

Landforms of Berkeley County, South Carolina
Swamps of South Carolina